Damian Rashad Swann (born December 4, 1992) is a  former American football cornerback. He played college football at the University of Georgia.

Early life
Swann was born in Atlanta, Georgia. He came from a rough background, but still played football, as well as playing baseball and basketball. He attended Henry W. Grady High School in Atlanta. He was heavily recruited by colleges and became the first person in his family to attend college once recruited by Georgia.

College career
Swann played for the Georgia Bulldogs from 2011 to 2014. He earned Associated Press Second-team All-SEC honors his senior season.

Professional career

New Orleans Saints
Swann was drafted by the New Orleans Saints in the fifth round of the 2015 NFL Draft. He signed a four-year contract with the Saints on May 11, 2015. He played in seven games, starting two, for the team during the 2015 season.  He suffered three concussions in a span of nine weeks and was placed on the injured reserve list with three weeks to go in the season.  He returned to the team for training camp in 2016, but on August 31, 2016 it was reported that the Saints had again placed him on injured reserve, ending his season.

On September 2, 2017, Swann was waived by the Saints.

Atlanta Legends
In January 2019, Swann joined the Atlanta Legends of the Alliance of American Football. The league ceased operations in April 2019.

Winnipeg Blue Bombers
Swann signed with the Winnipeg Blue Bombers of the CFL on March 17, 2020. He was released on June 18, 2021.

References

External links
 Georgia Bulldogs bio

1992 births
Living people
American football cornerbacks
Georgia Bulldogs football players
New Orleans Saints players
Players of American football from Atlanta
Atlanta Legends players
Winnipeg Blue Bombers players